Franz Xaver Andreas Jungwirth (1 December 1720, Munich - 5 January 1790, Munich) was a German copper engraver and etcher.

Life and work 
He began by reproducing the religious works of contemporary Bavarian artists, as well as images from churches, Andachtsbilder (devotional images), allegories, and symbolic works.

He created over eighty portrait etchings, based on the works of Giovanni Battista Piazzetta. Some sources give a higher number. He also produced numerous views of Munich and Freising, loosely based on the vedute of Bernardo Bellotto. Among his most familiar works are the copperplate engraving of Franz Ignaz Oefele, the Bavarian court painter, and a depiction of the altar at St. Michael's Church; based on a work by Hans von Aachen.

His most extensive individual work involved a series of 100 etchings, inspired by Psalm 51. Designs for funeral decorations were among his miscellaneous works; along with some commissions from local book publishers.

His son, Maximus, was also one of his students, but he died while still quite young, in 1768.

Sources 
 Jungwirth, Franz Xaver. In: Lorenz von Westenrieder: Beschreibung der Haupt- und Residenzstadt München im gegenwärtigen Zustande. Verlag Johann Baptist Strobl, München 1782, S. 403 (Google Books)
Georg Kaspar Nagler, Neues allgemeines Künstler-Lexicon: oder Nachrichten von dem Leben und den Werken der Maler, Bildhauer, Baumeister, Kupferstecher etc., E. A. Fleischmann, 1838 (Google Books)
 Felix Joseph von Lipowsky: Baierisches Künstler-Lexicon. Vol.1, pg.136 (Online)

External links 

 
 Works by Jungwirth @ the Digitaler Porträtindex

1720 births
1790 deaths
German engravers
German etchers
Artists from Munich